Adeel Shahzad is a Pakistani politician who is member-elect of the Provincial Assembly of Sindh.

Political career

He was elected to the Provincial Assembly of Sindh as a candidate of Muttahida Qaumi Movement from Constituency PS-118 (Karachi West-VII) in Pakistani general election, 2018.

References

Living people
Year of birth missing (living people)
Politicians from Karachi
1992 births